Werner Rudolph Linde (born 13 October 1944) is an Australian former basketball player. He competed in the men's tournament at the 1964 Summer Olympics.

References

1944 births
Living people
Australian men's basketball players
Olympic basketball players of Australia
Basketball players at the 1964 Summer Olympics
Place of birth missing (living people)